Fauna Hawaiiensis or the Zoology of the Sandwich (Hawaiian) Isles is a three-volume work,
published between 1899 and 1913, on the fauna of Hawaii. It was edited by David Sharp.

External links
Fauna Hawaiiensis digital version at the Bishop Museum

Zoological literature
Natural history of Hawaii